Harkaleh is a village in Khuzestan Province, Iran.

Harkaleh may also refer to:
 Harkaleh-ye Mohammad Jafar
 Harkaleh-ye Mohammadabad
 Harkaleh-ye Monari